The Fitzgerald Micropolitan Statistical Area, as defined by the United States Census Bureau, is an area consisting of two counties in Georgia, anchored by the city of Fitzgerald.

As of the 2000 census, the area had a population of 27,415 (though a July 1, 2009 estimate placed the population at 27,653).

Counties
Ben Hill
Irwin

Communities
Incorporated places
Fitzgerald (Principal city)
Ocilla
Unincorporated places
Bowen's Mill
Irwinville
Mystic
Queensland

Demographics
As of the census of 2000, there were 27,415 people, 10,317 households, and 7,327 families residing within the area. The racial makeup of the area was 66.41% White, 30.19% African American, 0.15% Native American, 0.30% Asian, 0.01% Pacific Islander, 2.27% from other races, and 0.67% from two or more races. Hispanic or Latino of any race were 3.65% of the population.

The median income for a household in the area was $28,679, and the median income for a family was $34,129. Males had a median income of $27,789 versus $20,040 for females. The per capita income for the area was $14,480.

See also

Georgia census statistical areas

References

 
Geography of Ben Hill County, Georgia
Geography of Irwin County, Georgia